The Beano Summer Special is like The Beano with extra comic strips, which as its name suggests, was released in the summer and are considered more valuable than the standard editions. This special first started in 1963 with a joint Beano-Dandy summer special and then in 1964 the first Beano summer special appeared. These ran continually until 2003 when they were replaced by Beano specials, which was a series of monthly special Beanos including a Summer Special released in the Summer. In 2006, the Beano specials was discontinued in favour of BeanoMAX. However, in 2011 an ultimate summer special exclusive to WHSmith was released and so was The Beano 3-D Summer Annual 2011. Unlike the traditional Beano of the time, this edition of the comic had a more colourful appearance to it. The front cover of these comics often had one picture which had a caption encouraging the reader to turn to the rear cover to see what happens next. As well as Beano Summer Specials there were also Bash Street Kids Summer Specials.

The Beano
Publications established in 1963